The Scots Hotel is a hotel in Tiberias, Israel, formerly the Scots Mission Hospital, also known as the Scottish Compound. The hotel is run by the Church of Scotland.

History

The hospital was originally founded in 1894 by the Scottish doctor and minister David Watt Torrance, who had first arrived in Tiberias in 1884, as the head of the Church of Scotland mission, to serve the rapidly expanding population. The hospital accepted patients of all races and religions. In 1894, it moved to the current, larger premises at Beit abu Shamnel abu Hannah. In 1923 his son, Dr. Herbert Watt Torrance, was appointed head of the hospital. After the establishment of the State of Israel, it became a maternity hospital supervised by the Israeli Department of Health. 

After its closure in 1959, the building became a guesthouse, known as the Scottish Hospice. In 1999, it was renovated at the cost of around £10,000,000 and reopened as the Scots Hotel.

See also
St Andrew's Church, Jerusalem

References

External links
Scots Hotel Tiberias, homepage (1) on Church of Scotland website (2021)
Scots Hotel Tiberias, homepage (2) at inisrael.com (2021)
Scottish church in Tiberias, homepage - St Andrew's Galilee congregation (2021)
St Andrew's Church, Jerusalem, homepage with links to further facilities in Israel (2021)
Historical photos (1934-46), American Colony Jerusalem/Matson Collection, at US Library of Congress. Accessed 2021.
Historical photos from Matson Collection, BBC News article. Accessed 2021.

Hotels in Israel
Church of Scotland